The Little Commonwealth was a school run by Homer Lane in Dorset during the 1910s known for its permissive libertarian approach to education.

Bibliography 

 
 
 
 
 
 

Schools in Dorset